The Independent Revolutionary Party (PRI) is a minor political party of the Dominican Republic, without parliamentary representation after the 16 May 2006 election. The PRI was created by Jacobo Majluta as a way to further his political and electoral ambitions. 

The party was founded in 1989 by Jacobo Majluta, who served briefly as President of the Dominican Republic in 1982 and Vice President from 1978 to 1982. His wife, former first lady Ana Elisa Villanueva, served as the party's vice president.

References

broadleft.org: Leftist Parties of the World, Dominican Republic. April 25, 2005.

Political parties in the Dominican Republic